Haris Duljević (born 16 November 1993) is a Bosnian professional footballer who plays as a winger for 2. Bundesliga club Hansa Rostock and the Bosnia and Herzegovina national team.

Duljević started his professional career at Čelik Zenica, before joining Olimpic in 2011. Three years later, he switched to Sarajevo. In 2017, he moved to Dynamo Dresden. Two years later, Duljević was transferred to Nîmes. He signed with Hansa Rostock in 2021.

A former youth international for Bosnia and Herzegovina, Duljević made his senior international debut in 2016, earning over 20 caps since.

Club career

Early career
Duljević started playing football at a local club, before joining youth setup of his hometown club Olimpic in 2009. He made his professional debut playing for Čelik Zenica on 10 April 2011 at the age of 17.

In March 2012, he returned to Olimpic. On 6 April 2013, he scored his first professional goal against Velež.

Sarajevo
In April 2014, Duljević switched to Sarajevo on a three-year deal. He made his official debut for the team in UEFA Europa League qualifier against Haugesund on 17 July. On 7 August, he scored his first goal for Sarajevo against Atromitos. Three days later, he made his league debut against Borac Banja Luka and managed to score a goal. He won his first trophy with the club on 30 May 2015, when they were crowned league champions.

In November, he was named team captain.

Dynamo Dresden
In August 2017, Duljević signed a three-year contract with German side Dynamo Dresden. He made his competitive debut for the club on 27 August against VfL Bochum. On 27 November, he scored his first goal for Dynamo Dresden in a triumph over Fortuna Düsseldorf.

Nîmes
In July 2019, Duljević was transferred to French outfit Nîmes for an undisclosed fee. He debuted officially for the side against Paris Saint-Germain on 11 August. On 10 February 2021, he scored his first goal for Nîmes in Coupe de France game against Nice.

Hansa Rostock
In September, Duljević moved to Hansa Rostock on a two-year deal. He debuted competitively for the club against Schalke 04 on 25 September.

International career
Duljević was a member of Bosnia and Herzegovina under-21 team under coach Vlado Jagodić.

In March 2016, he received his first senior call-up, for friendly games against Luxembourg and Switzerland. He debuted against the former on 25 March.

On 8 September 2018, in a 2018–19 UEFA Nations League game against Northern Ireland, Duljević scored his first senior international goal.

Personal life
Duljević married his long-time girlfriend Sara in July 2019. Together they have two children, a daughter named Uma and a son named Džan.

Career statistics

Club

International

Scores and results list Bosnia and Herzegovina's goal tally first, score column indicates score after each Duljević goal.

Honours
Sarajevo
Bosnian Premier League: 2014–15

References

External links

1993 births
Living people
Footballers from Sarajevo
Bosniaks of Bosnia and Herzegovina
Bosnia and Herzegovina Muslims
Bosnia and Herzegovina footballers
Bosnia and Herzegovina under-21 international footballers
Bosnia and Herzegovina international footballers
Bosnia and Herzegovina expatriate footballers
Association football wingers
NK Čelik Zenica players
FK Olimpik players
FK Sarajevo players
Dynamo Dresden players
Nîmes Olympique players
FC Hansa Rostock players
Premier League of Bosnia and Herzegovina players
2. Bundesliga players
Ligue 1 players
Expatriate footballers in Germany
Expatriate footballers in France
Bosnia and Herzegovina expatriate sportspeople in Germany
Bosnia and Herzegovina expatriate sportspeople in France